Nahr-e Azraq (also known as 'Azraq and Kabūdān) is a village in Nasar Rural District, Arvandkenar District, Abadan County, Khuzestan Province, Iran. At the 2006 census, its population was 311, in 66 families.

References 

Populated places in Abadan County